This is a list of novelists from Africa, including those associated with as well as born in specified countries.

A
 Chris Abani (born 1966), Nigeria
 P. A. K. Aboagye (1925–2001), Ghana
 Peter Abrahams (born 1919), South Africa
 Nana Achampong (born 1964), Ghana
 Chinua Achebe (1930–2013), Nigeria
 Ayọ̀bámi Adébáyọ̀ (born 1988), Nigeria
 Bayo Adebowale (born 1944), Nigeria
 Sade Adeniran (born 1960s), Nigeria
 Chimamanda Ngozi Adichie (born 1977), Nigeria
 Maxamed Daahir Afrax (living), Somalia
 Jeannette D. Ahonsou (born 1954), Togo
 Ama Ata Aidoo (born 1942), Ghana
 Zaynab Alkali (born 1950), Nigeria
 T. M. Aluko (1918–2010), Nigeria 
 Elechi Amadi (1934–2016), Nigeria
 David Ananou (1917–2000), Togo
 Kwame Anthony Appiah (born 1954), Ghana
 Lesley Nneka Arimah (living), Nigeria
 Ayi Kwei Armah (born 1939), Ghana
 Khadambi Asalache (1935–2006), Kenya
 Bediako Asare (born 1930), Ghana
 Mary Ashun (born 1968), Ghana
 Ryad Assani-Razaki (born 1981) 
 Sefi Atta (born 1964), Nigeria
 Ayesha Harruna Attah (born 1983), Ghana
 Adaeze Atuegwu (born 1977), Nigeria 
 Kofi Awoonor (1935–2013), Ghana

B
 Mariama Bâ (1929–1981), Senegal
 Rotimi Babatunde (living), Nigeria
 Yaba Badoe (born 1955), Ghana
 Elizabeth-Irene Baitie (born 1970)
 Ellen Banda-Aaku (born 1965)
 Biyi Bandele (1967–2022), Nigeria
 A. Igoni Barrett (born 1979), Nigeria
 Empi Baryeh (living), Ghana
 Jackee Budesta Batanda (living), Uganda
 Francis Bebey (1929–2001), Cameroon
 Philip Begho (born 1956), Nigeria
 Sokhna Benga (born 1967), Senegal
 Mongo Beti (1932–2001), Cameroon
 Calixthe Beyala (born 1961), Cameroon
 Olympe Bhêly-Quénum (born 1928), Benin
 John Benibengor Blay (born 1915), Ghana
 Amba Bongo, Democratic Republic of the Congo
 Nazi Boni (1909–1969), Burkina Faso
 Tanella Boni (born 1954), Côte d'Ivoire
 André Brink (1935–2015), South Africa
 Ken Bugul (born 1947), Senegal
 NoViolet Bulawayo (born 1981), Zimbabwe
 Akosua Busia (born 1966), Ghana

C
 J. E. Casely-Hayford (1866–1930), Ghana
 Faarax M. J. Cawl (1937–1991), Somalia
 Syl Cheney-Coker (born 1945), Sierra Leone
 Panashe Chigumadzi (born 1991), Zimbabwe
 Shadreck Chikoti (born 1979), Malawi
 Brian Chikwava (born 1972), Zimbabwe
 Shimmer Chinodya (born 1957), Zimbabwe
 Paulina Chiziane (born 1955), Mozambique
 J. M. Coetzee (born 1940), South Africa
 Teju Cole (born 1975), Nigeria
 Félix Couchoro (1900–1968), Togo
 Mia Couto (born 1955), Mozambique

D
 Bernard Binlin Dadié (1916–2019), Côte d'Ivoire
 Tsitsi Dangarembga (born 1959), Zimbabwe
 Amma Darko (born 1956), Ghana
 Lawrence Darmani (living), Ghana
 Nadia Davids (born 1977), South Africa
 Aïda Mady Diallo (living), Mali
 Ebou Dibba (1943–2000), The Gambia
 Jude Dibia (born 1975), Nigeria
 Boubacar Boris Diop (born 1946), Senegal
 Mbella Sonne Dipoko (1936–2009)
 Waris Dirie (born 1965)
 Amu Djoleto (born 1929), Ghana
 Richard Dogbeh (1932–2003), Benin/Senegal/Ivory Coast
 Emmanuel Dongala (born 1941), Republic of the Congo
 Cameron Duodu (born 1937), Ghana

E
 Kossi Efoui (born 1962), Togo
 Obi Egbuna (1938–2014), Nigeria
 Christiane Akoua Ekue (born 1954), Togo
 Cyprian Ekwensi (1921–2007), Nigeria
 Mohammad Elsannour (living), Egypt
 Buchi Emecheta (1944–2017), Nigeria
 Rosemary Esehagu (born 1981), Nigeria

F
 Daniel O. Fagunwa (1903–1963), Nigeria
 Nuruddin Farah (born 1945), Somalia
 Adélaïde Fassinou (born 1955), Benin
 Aminatta Forna (born 1964), Sierra Leone
 Bilkisu Funtuwa (living), Nigeria

G
 Clifton Gachagua (born 1987), Kenya
 Petina Gappah (born 1971), Zimbabwe
 Hawa Jande Golakai (born 1979), Liberia
 Nadine Gordimer (1923–2014), South Africa
 Abdulrazak Gurnah (born 1948), Tanzania
 Yaa Gyasi (born 1989), Ghana

H
 Helon Habila (born 1967), Nigeria
 Bessie Head (1937–1986), South Africa/Botswana
 Chenjerai Hove (1956–2015), Zimbabwe

I
 Abubakar Adam Ibrahim (born 1979), Nigeria
 Emmanuel Iduma (born 1989), Nigeria
 Monique Ilboudo (born 1959) is an author and human rights activist from, Burkina Faso
 Jowhor Ile (living), Nigeria
 Eddie Iroh, Nigeria
 Moses Isegawa (born 1963), Uganda
 Festus Iyayi (born 1947), Nigeria

J
 Dan Jacobson (1929–2014), South Africa
 Sousa Jamba (born 1966), Angola
 Delia Jarrett-Macauley (living), Sierra Leone
 Elnathan John (born 1982), Nigeria

K
 Legson Kayira (died 2012), Malawi
 Fatou Keïta (born 1965), Côte d'Ivoire
 China Keitetsi (born 1976), Uganda
 Euphrase Kezilahabi (1944–2020), Tanzania
 Fred Khumalo (born 1966), South Africa

 Karen King-Aribisala (living), Nigeria
 Asare Konadu (1932–1994), Ghana
 Marie-Christine Koundja (born 1957)
 Ahmadou Kourouma (1927–2003), Côte d'Ivoire
 Benjamin Kwakye (born 1967), Ghana
 Goretti Kyomuhendo (born 1965), Uganda

L
 Alex La Guma (1925–1985), South Africa
 Kojo Laing (born 1946), Ghana
 Mandla Langa (born 1950), South Africa
 Camara Laye (1928–1980), Guinea
 Doris Lessing (1919–2013), South Africa
 Ophelia S. Lewis (born 1961), Liberia
 Werewere Liking (born 1950), Cameroon/Côte d'Ivoire
 Lesley Lokko (living), Ghana

M
 Ignatius Mabasa (born 1971), Zimbabwe
 Lina Magaia (1940–2011), Mozambique
 Arthur Maimane (1932–2005), South Africa
 Barbara Makhalisa (born 1949), Zimbabwe
 Jennifer Nansubuga Makumbi (born 1960s), Uganda
 Charles Mangua (1939–2021), Kenya
 Sarah Ladipo Manyika (living), Nigeria/UK
 Nozipa Maraire (born 1964), Zimbabwe
 Dambudzo Marechera (1952–1987), Zimbabwe
 Zakes Mda (born 1948), South Africa
 Dinaw Mengestu (born 1978), Ethiopia/US
 Maaza Mengiste (born 1971), Ethiopia/US
 Felix Mnthali (born 1933), Malawi
 Thomas Mofolo (1876–1948), Lesotho 
 Nadifa Mohamed (born 1981), Somaliland
 Nthikeng Mohlele (living), South Africa
 Tierno Monénembo (born 1947), Guinea
 Bai T. Moore (1916–1988), Liberia
 A. S. Mopeli-Paulus (born 1913), Lesotho
 Fiston Mwanza Mujila (born 1981), Congo
 Charles Mungoshi (1947–2019)), Zimbabwe
 David Mungoshi (1949–2020), Zimbabwe
 Solomon Mutswairo (1924–2005), Zimbabwe
 Meja Mwangi (born 1948), Kenya

N
 Glaydah Namukasa, Uganda
 Njabulo Ndebele (born 1948), South Africa
 Okey Ndibe (born 1960), Nigeria
 Donato Ndongo-Bidyogo (born 1950), Equatorial Guinea
 Patrice Nganang (born 1970), Cameroon
 Lauretta Ngcobo (1931–2015), South Africa
 Ngũgĩ wa Thiong'o (born 1938), Kenya
 Mũkoma wa Ngũgĩ (born 1971), Kenya
 Wanjiku wa Ngũgĩ (born 1970s), Kenya
 Rebeka Njau (born 1932), Kenya
 Lewis Nkosi (1936–2010), South Africa
 Jérôme Nouhouaï (living), Benin
 María Nsué Angüe (1945–2017), Equatorial Guinea
 Martina Nwakoby (born 1937), Nigeria
 Nkem Nwankwo (1936–2001), Nigeria
 Flora Nwapa (1931–1993), Nigeria
 Adaobi Tricia Nwaubani (born 1976), Nigeria
 Stanley Nyamfukudza (born 1951), Zimbabwe

O
 Chigozie Obioma (born 1986), Nigeria
 Trifonia Melibea Obono (born 1982), Equatorial Guinea
 Asenath Bole Odaga (1937–2014), Kenya
 Taiwo Odubiyi (born 1965), Nigeria
 Nana Oforiatta Ayim (living), Ghana
 Margaret Ogola (1958–2011), Kenya
 Grace Ogot (1930–2015), Kenya
 Gabriel Okara (1921–2019), Nigeria
 Irenosen Okojie (living), Nigeria
 Nnedi Okorafor (born 1974), Nigeria/US
 Ifeoma Okoye (born 1937?), Nigeria
 Chinelo Okparanta (born 1981)
 Isidore Okpewho (1941–2016), Nigeria
 Ben Okri (born 1959), Nigeria
 Ukamaka Olisakwe (born 1982), Nigeria
 Kole Omotoso (born 1943), Nigeria
 Yewande Omotoso (born 1980), South African/Nigeria
 Ondjaki (born 1977), Angola
 Chibundu Onuzo (born 1991), Nigeria
 Yambo Ouologuem (1940–2017), Mali
 Helen Ovbiagele (born 1944), Nigeria
 Yvonne Adhiambo Owuor (born 1968), Kenya
 Ferdinand Oyono (1929–2010), Cameroon
 Kachi A. Ozumba (living), Nigeria

P
 Nii Ayikwei Parkes (born 1974), Ghana
 Alan Paton (1903–1988), South Africa
 Pepetela (born 1941), Angola
 Lenrie Peters (1932–2009), Gambia
 Olúmìdé Pópóọlá (living), Nigeria/Germany
 Tolulope Popoola (living), Nigeria

Q
 Kwei Quartey (living), Ghana/US

R
 Angèle Ntyugwetondo Rawiri (1954–2010), Gabon
 Richard Rive (1931–1989), South Africa
 Henrietta Rose-Innes (born 1971), South Africa
 David Rubadiri (1930–2018), Malawi
 Bonwell Kadyankena Rodgers (born 1991), Malawi

S
 Stanlake Samkange (1922–1988), Zimbabwe
 Williams Sassine (1944–1997), Guinea
 Kobina Sekyi (1892–1956), Ghana
 Taiye Selasi (born 1979), Ghana/Nigeria
 Francis Selormey (1927–1983), Ghana
 Namwali Serpell (born 1980), Zambia
 Abdi Sheik Abdi (born 1942), Somalia
 Vamba Sherif (born 1973), Liberia
 Lola Shoneyin (born 1974), Nigeria
 Gillian Slovo (born 1952), South Africa
 Aminata Sow Fall (born 1941), Senegal
 Wole Soyinka (born 1934), Nigeria

T
 Véronique Tadjo (born 1955), Côte d'Ivoire
 Sony Lab'ou Tansi (1947–1995), Democratic Republic of the Congo
 Miriam Tlali (1933–2017), South Africa
 Amos Tutuola (1920–1997), Nigeria

U
 Gracy Ukala (born 1946), Nigeria
 Adaora Lily Ulasi (born 1932), Nigeria
 Rems Umeasiegbu (born 1943), Nigeria
 Chika Unigwe (born 1974), Nigeria

V
 Yvonne Vera (1964–2005), Zimbabwe
 Abraham Verghese (born 1955)
 José Luandino Vieira (born 1935), Angola

W
 Charity Waciuma (born 1936), Kenya
 Timothy Wangusa (born 1942), Uganda
 Zukiswa Wanner (born 1976), South Africa
 Mary Watson (born 1975), South Africa
 Myne Whitman (born 1977), Nigeria
 Zoe Wicomb (born 1948), South Africa

Y
 Adrienne Yabouza (born 1965), Central African Republic
 Balaraba Ramat Yakubu (born 1959), Nigeria

Z
 Paul Tiyambe Zeleza (born 1955), Malawi
 Norbert Zongo (1949–1998), Burkina Faso

References

 Novelists
African